Terry O'Brien can refer to:

 Terry O'Brien (footballer) (1918–2011), Australian rules footballer
 Terry O'Brien (luger) (born 1943), American Olympic luger